The Bloedel Floral Conservatory is a conservatory and aviary located at the top of Queen Elizabeth Park, Vancouver, British Columbia, Canada.

History
In 1966, communities and organizations across Canada were encouraged to engage in centennial projects to celebrate the country's 100th anniversary. The projects ranged from special one-time events to local improvement projects. In Vancouver, Stuart Lefeaux, superintendent of the Vancouver Park Board and his deputy Bill Livingstone wanted to create an exciting icon that would enhance the image of the city. Their vision was to build a conservatory for exotic plants that would be both educational and a good place for families to go.

Building a conservatory on top of Queen Elizabeth Park's Little Mountain was a complicated project. The city had already leased the top of the mountain to the Greater Vancouver Water Board and they had built a -acre open water reservoir for the city's potable water supply. A concrete lid was constructed in 1965 to cover the reservoir, but approval was needed to build the conservatory's surrounding plaza on top of the cover. The project was not to detract from the natural beauty of the site, nor to jeopardize the quality of the potable water supply in the reservoir. Climates had to be simulated for temperate, tropical and arid areas in the botanical displays inside the conservatory, and the project was not to exceed the budget. Giving the immense concrete plaza over the reservoir an attractive garden atmosphere meant working within rigid and expensive water board restrictions.
These challenges were overcome, and the conservatory was constructed next to this reservoir, which remains a major source of water for the city today.

Philanthropy from extraction companies was at an all-time high during the 1960s, so Lefeux and Livingstone looked for a way to get the project funded. They approached Prentice Bloedel of the Macmillan Bloedel Lumber Company. The Bloedel Foundation put forward $1.25 million in conjunction with contributions by the City of Vancouver and the Vancouver Board of Parks and Recreation to build the Bloedel Conservatory, the Dancing Fountains and the surrounding plaza. This gift was the largest the city of Vancouver had received to that date.

The triodetic dome frame was manufactured entirely in Ottawa and shipped 3,000 miles across the country to Queen Elizabeth Park. Once it arrived, the structural framework was erected in
just 10 days. The entire dome and plaza took 18 months to complete. The grand opening of the conservatory took place to much fanfare on December 6, 1969, and hosted over 500,000 people in its first year of operation. Prentice and his wife Virginia, both avid art collectors, also donated the monumental bronze sculpture 'Knife Edge - Two Piece' by famed artist Henry Moore.

In November 2009, facing a large budget shortfall, the Vancouver Park Board voted in favour of closing the conservatory. The approximately $240,000 CDN annual operating budget, the need for a roof replacement and other major capital costs were cited by members of the board as reasons for the decision. The closure was to take effect on March 1, 2010, just after Vancouver had finished hosting the 2010 Winter Olympic and Paralympic Games. In response to the decision several groups formed in order to lobby both the board and city council.

In early January 2010, a commissioner reported that attendance numbers were up sharply in December 2009 over December 2008 now that construction projects at the adjacent reservoir on Little Mountain and along Cambie Street, which started in 2003, had been completed. By the end of January, the Friends of the Bloedel Association had helped raise $80,000, and was projecting $250,000 by the proposed March closure. In late February, the park board voted to keep the facility open and asked for proposals on running it.

On April 29, 2010, the Friends of the Bloedel Association and VanDusen Botanical Garden Association submitted a proposal to the Vancouver Park Board to run the Bloedel Conservatory as part of the VanDusen Botanical Gardens, and the conservatory remained open. At least one other proposal was received, but the joint proposal of the Friends of the Bloedel and the Association was approved by the Services and Budgets Committee of the Vancouver Park Board on July 20, 2010, and unanimously approved by the full Park Board on September 20, 2010. On May 29, 2013, the Friends of the Bloedel won the City of Vancouver Heritage Commission Award of Honour, which "denotes an outstanding contribution to heritage conservation in the City of Vancouver and recognises the advocacy and successful efforts to save and revitalize landmark sites". The VanDusen Botanical Garden Association later changed their name to the Vancouver Botanical Gardens Association to reflect the additional management of Bloedel Conservatory.

Plants and animals
The conservatory contains three habitats: tropical rainforest, subtropical rainforest, and desert. Over 200 birds of various species reside within the dome and are allowed to fly free.  Also on display are an array of tropical fish. The Bloedel Floral Conservatory houses about 500 species and varieties of plants from deep jungle to desert clime, all within the dome. The conservatory is home to Bougainvilleas and Browallias, citrus and coffee trees, Eucalypti and epiphytes, Euphorbia and various figs, Gardenia and Hibiscus. Magnolia trees share space with delicate lilies, yucca with pteris (ferns).

Architecture
There are 32 different shapes and sizes, but each bubble measures 9 inches in height. It contains 8 air circulating units and 24 mist sprayers to control temperature and humidity for 3 separate climatic zones inside the dome.

The Triodetic System was developed and patented in Canada in 1955 by F. Fentiman and Sons of Ottawa. This system was originally made from aluminum components. It uses extruded cylindrical solid aluminum hubs (nodes) with slots, and tubular aluminum or steel members with matching crimped ends. Triodetic joints resist tension, compression and combined cross loading. Triodetic domes are designed as double curved shells which allow increased structural advantages for the span:rise ratio. The use of triangles makes the structure rigid and very strong, and similar to the geodesic design, stresses are transmitted throughout the structure. Even with light structural components, triodetic domes are able to withstand extremes of wind and even earth quakes. This enables a large interior volume to be enclosed without the need for internal supporting columns.

In the plaza adjacent to the conservatory dome is a bronze sculpture by Henry Moore, Knife Edge Two Piece 1962–65. It was donated to the Park Board by avid modern art collector Prentice Bloedel and his wife Virginia along with the funding to build the conservatory, the surrounding plaza and fountains.

Moore created this piece in 1962, and authorized three castings of the work. The first stands on Nelson Rockefeller's New York estate, the second is outside the House of Lords, in London,
England, and the third is situated to the south of the conservatory next to the Dancing Fountains. Knife Edge was the first non-commemorative sculpture accepted by the Vancouver Park Board. It was donated by Prentice Bloedel and his wife Virginia to tie the conservatory dome and the design of the adjacent fountain plaza to the inspiration and power of nature.

Photo gallery

Filming location
The conservatory has been used as a filming location for several movies and science fiction series including G-Saviour, Battlestar Galactica, Stargate SG-1, Gene Roddenberry's Andromeda and Beyond the Black Rainbow. Filming of a scene from episode 21, Season 3 of Supergirl also took place here.

See also
 List of botanical gardens in Canada

References

External links

 
 Friends of the Bloedel
 Vancouver Botanical Gardens Association

Gardens in Canada
Culture of Vancouver
Aviaries in Canada
Tourist attractions in Vancouver
Botanical gardens in Canada
Greenhouses in Canada
Buildings and structures in Vancouver